Said Mohammad Sammour (born 1950) is a Syrian military officer and politician who served as interior minister between 2009 and 2011.

Early life and education
Sammour was born in Jableh in 1950. He received a bachelor of arts degree in English literature. He also holds a diploma in aeronautical science.

Career
Sammour is a former major general. He was the chief of Syrian military intelligence in Homs. He also served in the same post in charge with the Damascus Region. Then he was appointed deputy chief of the military intelligence in 2005, and served in the post until 2009.

On 23 April 2009, Sammour was appointed interior minister to the cabinet headed by Prime Minister Mohammad Naji al-Otari, replacing Bassam Abdel Majid in the post. In April 2011, Sammour was replaced by Mohammad al-Shaar as interior minister.

Personal life
Sammour is married and has four children.

References

External links

1950 births
Arab Socialist Ba'ath Party – Syria Region politicians
Living people
People from Jableh
Syrian generals
Syrian ministers of interior